Chef Software, Inc. was an American corporation headquartered in Seattle, Washington, which produced configuration management software. It was acquired in 2020 and merged to become Progress Chef.

History 
The company was founded as Opscode in 2008 by current Chief Technology Officer Adam Jacob, Jesse Robbins, Barry Steinglass, and Nathan Haneysmith. Chef is based in Seattle, with regional offices in Berlin, London, Belfast and San Francisco. In Sep 2015, Chef Chef was valued at $360 million after a $40 million  venture capital funding round.

In November 2015, the company acquired a German security startup, VulcanoSec.

In 2019, it was discovered by a journalist that U.S. Immigration and Customs Enforcement was paying Chef approximately $95,000 per year for a software license. At that time, a former Chef employee deleted his code repository in protest of the contract. The company did not announce any changes to its contracting processes or partners.

In September 2020, the company announced that it was being purchased by Progress Software with an intended final date in October. A press release gave the price of acquisition at $220 million. The merged company was named Progress Chef.

Products and Licensing

Chef offered a single commercial product, Chef Automate, released at ChefConf in July 2016. Chef Automate includes a full-stack continuous deployment pipeline, and automated testing for compliance and security.

Chef Automate builds on two of Chef's open source projects - Chef and InSpec - and integrates with the company's third open source project, Habitat. Habitat offers "application automation" to simplify running complex applications in different environments including containers, traditional data servers, or PaaS.

Chef offered three versions of its product: Chef Basics (free, open source), Hosted Chef ($72/node, minimum 20 node purchase), and Chef Automate ($137/node, annual subscription).

References

External links

Progress Software
Defunct software companies of the United States
Software companies based in Washington (state)